Campo dos Amarais–Prefeito Francisco Amaral State Airport , also known as Amarais Airport, is an airport serving Campinas, Brazil.

It is operated by Rede Voa.

History
On March 15, 2017 Voa São Paulo was granted by the government of the State of São Paulo the concession to operate this facility, previously operated by DAESP.

Airlines and destinations
No scheduled flights operate at this airport.

Access

See also

List of airports in Brazil

References

External links

Airports in São Paulo (state)
Transport in Campinas